The sombrero vueltiao (Colombian Spanish for turned hat) is a traditional hat from Colombia and one of its symbols. It is made out of Gynerium sagittatum known locally as caña flecha, a type of cane that grows in the region. The word vueltiao is a Colombian regionalism from the northern Caribbean Region and the area surrounding the Magdalena River basin that originate in the word for "turn" or "lap" (Spanish vuelta), and arose due to the way the hat is made. The quality of the hat is determined by the number of pairs of fibers braided together to make the hat, and its bending flexibility. The more flexible the hat is, the higher quality it is.

Origin and History
The making of the hat originated amongst the Zenú tribes located in the Sinú river region, between the Córdoba and Sucre departments of Colombia. Under the denomination of ″Zenú breed″ there was three empires: Finzenú, Panzenú and Zenufana. Since the pre-Hispanic, the aborigines used the hat for sun protection during the corn crop, as evidence of an investigation in the Gold Museum in Bogotá and the Luigi Pigorini Museum in Rome. The hat probably formed part of the hierarchy ritual of the tribe and it had also powerful fertilization beliefs. The Colombian delegation to the 2004 Olympics wore the vueltiao during the opening ceremony. It is also traditionally worn by cumbia dancers and vallenato artists.

Making a sombrero vueltiao 

Making a sombrero vueltiao is a lengthy process. First, the caña flecha leaves must be dried and the veins removed using a knife and a piece of leather to obtain uniform, sturdy strips. The strips are then dried in the sun until they turn from green to beige or white, and are sorted according to color. The beige, or "dirty strips" (Spanish:sucias) are then soaked in sand-free black mud. After about three or four days in the mud, the colored strips are washed thoroughly with cold water and boiled in vija, another wild plant, for at least a couple of hours. After this, the tinted strips are again dried in the sun for several days, and the coloring process is repeated until they have reached a uniform black color.

After the desired colors are obtained, the caña flecha strips are woven into the braids that are used to form the sombrero. This can take many days, depending on the desired quality. The olma, or central part of the top of the hat, is the first part of the hat to be woven. The crown of the hat and later the wings are made. Once the manual part of constructing the hat is finished, the hat is completed by using a foot-driven sewing machine to sew the hat together.

Types of sombrero 

The Quinciano is the most commercially available Sombrero Vueltiao and also the cheapest. These hats are made in just three days, are loosely woven together, and use only 15 pairs of caña flecha strips to make the weave.

The Diecinueve, as the name suggests, uses 19 pairs of caña flecha strips to produce a finer braid that will result in a softer and finer sombrero. It can take up to a week to produce by hand.

The Veintiuno uses 21 pairs of caña flecha strands per weave and is finer than the Quinciano and the Diecinueve. These hats are usually custom-made to order and take 10 to 15 days to produce by hand.

The Veintitres is made of 23 pairs of caña flecha strips. The Veintitres, like the Veintiuno, is very fine and notably softer and lighter than the above. It takes from 12 to 20 days to make this sombrero from scratch.

The Veintisiete is the finest sombrero available and uses 27 pairs of caña flecha. It can be folded up and put in a pocket without being damaged. The weave is very dense, and is soft to the touch. The Veintisiete is the most expensive sombrero vueltiao and can take up to a month to produce by hand.

National symbol of Colombia 
The sombrero vueltiao is no longer just for Colombian peasants, as its popularity has sharply risen. The sombrero has also become a work of art admired and appreciated by the Colombians and foreigners alike. 

Most of these handmade hats are produced by entire Zenú families located in the Departments of Cordoba and Sucre.

This iconic symbol of Colombia has been sported by hundreds of personalities, including Pope John Paul II when he visited Colombia in 1986, and former President of the United States Bill Clinton when he visited Cartagena, Colombia in August 2000.

Gallery

See also
 Arhuaca mochila
 Ruana

References

External links

 Sombrero Vueltiao (in English)

National symbols of Colombia
Colombian clothing
Hats
Colombian handicrafts